The France national rugby league team represent France in international rugby league matches. They are referred to as les Chanticleers or less commonly as les Tricolores.  The team is run under the auspices of the Fédération Française de Rugby à XIII.

The French rugby league team first played in 1934 on a tour of England. They have taken part in all World Cups, 16 in total, with the first being held in 1954 in France. They have never won the title but finished runners-up in both 1954 and 1968. These are often considered the glory years of French rugby league as from the 1950s to the 1970s the team were strong and regularly beat Australia, New Zealand and Great Britain. Since those days, les Chanticleers have not done as well with their nadir occurring at the 1995 World Cup when they failed to win a single match.

In 2006, the Perpignan based team Catalans Dragons entered Super League, and have since produced a number of top-class French players. Recent successes of the French national team include reaching the quarter finals of the 2000 and 2013 Rugby League World Cups, and participating in the 2009 Rugby League Four Nations.  At the most recent World Cup in 2022, France failed to qualify for the quarter finals after being eliminated at the group stage.

Currently, France are ranked ninth in the world. In Europe alone they are ranked third, ahead of Ireland, Scotland, Wales and Italy, but behind Lebanon and their main rival, England.

History

1930s

On New Year's Eve 1933, England and Australia played in Paris – the first game of rugby league football in France. The match was one-sided, with Australia winning 63-13 in front of a crowd of about 5,000, but the seed was sown. French rugby union players, disgruntled that France had been suspended from the Five Nations Championship, formed the "Ligue Francaise de Rugby à XIII" on 6 April 1934. Jean Galia, a former rugby union international and champion boxer, led France on a six-match tour of England in 1934 and they recorded their first win in Kingston upon Hull. The national team's first game was in Paris on 15 April 1934, losing 21-32 to England in front of a crowd of 20,000. By 1939, the French League had 225 clubs and the national side won the 1938–39 European Rugby League Championship where they became the first French team in any sport to beat England at home.

1940s

The game of rugby league suffered in France during the Second World War, as administrators had rugby league banned. Some players and officials of the sport were punished (not reinstated in the French rugby union), whilst the total assets of the rugby league and its clubs were handed over to the union. After the war the French game was re-established and the French became one of rugby league's major powers, competing in the Rugby League World Cup and in major international series against Great Britain, Australia and New Zealand, despite continuing persecution (including remaining unable to call itself rugby until 1989, being called "jeu à XIII" (the game [played] in 13), which was an expression coined by Jean Gallia). In 1949, they became the first French sporting team to win at Wembley Stadium.

1950s

In 1951 France embarked on their first ever tour of Australasia, coached by Robert Samatan and led by the legendary chain-smoking fullback, Puig Aubert. Their flamboyant style of unorthodox attacking rugby attracted huge crowds. When the two nations met for the first Test, the match became the first "all ticket" international to be staged at the Sydney Cricket Ground, and attracted a crowd of over 60,000. On Saturday 30 June 1951, Australia secured a hard-fought second Test victory over France in Brisbane by 23 points to 11. The third Test took place at Sydney Cricket Ground three weeks later before a crowd of 67,009. Late tries from Duncan Hall and Brian Davies could not prevent the Kangaroos from suffering an embarrassing 35-14 defeat. France played 28 matches during the three-month tour, winning 21 matches, drawing twice and losing just five times.

In November 1951, France met "Other Nationalities" in an International Championship match at the Boulevard, Hull which became known as the "Battle of the Boulevard". Other Nationalities won 17-14 but the match centred on the behaviour of Edouard Ponsinet, who was involved in most of the violence that happened at the game. The Other Nationalities were down to eleven players at one stage, with Arthur Clues being the most serious casualty, hospitalised with head injuries. Eventually Ponsinet was sent off, ten minutes from time after breaking the nose of Jeff Burke. Despite this defeat France went on to retain the title with home victories over England and Wales.

In the 1954 World Cup, which was the first of either rugby code and was instigated by France, Les Tricolores defeated both Australia and New Zealand, and drew with Great Britain to reach the final. This was the closest they went to getting their hands on the World Cup, going down narrowly, 16-12, to Great Britain in the final in Parc des Princes. France donated the original World Cup trophy, but they have never won it.

France repeated the success of their 1951 tour in 1955, with even bigger attendances greeting the team. Puig Aubert had broken his arm just prior to the touring party leaving and did not tour. Despite this, France played splendidly to win the second test in Brisbane (in a spectacular game 29-28 before 45,000 fans at the Brisbane Cricket Ground) and the third test at the SCG. The 1951 and 1955 French sides that toured Australia are still regarded as two of the strongest sides ever to tour that country.

In the 1957 World Cup, held in Australia, the winner was decided by finishing top of the table with no final being played. France finished last, winning one match against New Zealand. History was made when the returning French and British squads visited South Africa and played a series of exhibition matches in Benoni, Durban and East London, all of which were won by the British.

1960s 
In the 1960 Rugby League World Cup France failed to win a match, and finished last for the second consecutive time.

On Sunday 8 December 1963, France defeated the Australians in the first Test of a three Test series during the Kangaroo tour of Europe. The match was held in Bordeaux.

France regained strength as the decade went on - defeating Australia quite comprehensively in the 1967-1968 series played in France, winning two games and drawing one.

The French reached the final of the 1968 Rugby League World Cup, the last time they have achieved that feat. They beat both Great Britain and New Zealand to qualify, but lost to Australia in Sydney, and so finished runners-up again.

1970s

France managed one victory in the 1970 Rugby League World Cup, a narrow win over Australia, who went on to win the Cup in the final. In 1972 France hosted the sixth World Cup and again only got the one win, in the opening match against New Zealand. The trend of underperforming in the World Cup continued for the French in the expanded 1975 tournament in which they got a lone win over Wales and a draw against New Zealand. Two years later in the 1977 World Cup they did not win a single match. But then on the 1978 Kangaroo tour, France beat Australia 13-10 and 11-10. This was Australia's last defeat in an international series or competition until the 2005 Tri-Nations.

1980s

Rugby league in France went through a riotous period at the beginning of the 1980s. The turbulent period was steadied by the influence of French Rugby League guru Jean-François Bouchet, however poor results followed. From 1985 to 1987 the team were beaten by New Zealand in Perpignan, drew with Great Britain in Avignon and were thrashed 52-0 in Carcassonne by Australia. Away from home they suffered a large defeat against Great Britain in Leeds. The team reached a low point when they were forced to forfeit away World Cup games against Australia, New Zealand and Papua New Guinea in the 1985-88 edition because of lack of funds.  Their only World Cup win was against Papua New Guinea in front of 3,500 people in Carcassonne.

1990s

In 1990, a Great Britain team including Shaun Edwards, Garry Schofield, Martin Offiah and Denis Betts were embarrassed by a 25-18 loss, France's first victory on English soil for 23 years and their last win over Great Britain/England. The team then met Papua New Guinea on Sunday 30 June 1991 in Rabaul, where they were beaten 28-24. On Sunday 7 July 1991, the two sides met again for a World Cup encounter at Danny Leahy Oval, Goroka. The heat and humidity caused France all kinds of problems, but Les Tricolores squeezed home 20-18.

On Sunday 27 October 1991, the first ever Test match involving the Soviet Union took place at the Stade Georges Lyvet, Villeurbanne, near Lyon, France. The Bears were beaten 26-6 by France. The Papua New Guinea national team wound up their 1991 tour of Europe with a World Cup rated Test match against France, which was played on Sunday 24 November at the Stade Albert Domec, Carcassonne. France defeated their visitors 28-14. In the 1995 World Cup France had to play the Samoans three days after taking a physical pounding from the Welsh in Cardiff.

John Kear was briefly in charge of Les Tricolores in 1997.

France took on Italy at the Parc des Sports, Avignon in November 1999. France needed a draw to win the Mediterranean Cup. The Italians, registered a memorable 14-10 victory, which handed the cup to the Lebanon.

2000s

France traveled to Pretoria for a match against South Africa on Saturday 3 November 2001. The French were too good for a young and inexperienced South African side. They scored four tries in each half, and won 44-6 after leading 24-0 at half-time.

In 2002, France lost to Lebanon 36–6 in front of 9,713 spectators at Tripoli in the Mediterranean Cup final.

In 2004 the French returned to form with a narrow 20-24 loss to New Zealand and a losing but creditable performance against Australia. In 2005, Les Tricolores played Australia again in Perpignan, suffering a 12-44 defeat. Unlike their last match against Australia, this game was played under normal rules and is considered a regular test match. This was their best performance in an official test match against Australia since 1990.

 Papua New Guinea toured France in the winter of 2007, with France winning both matches. After the tour, a match in Paris was scheduled against New Zealand, who were on their way home from a 3-0 test series defeat by Great Britain. A last minute try secured a 22-14 New Zealand win in front of a decent crowd despite Paris rail strikes. France participated in the 2008 World Cup after being granted automatic qualification. They were drawn in Group B with Scotland and Fiji.  Winning only one game and losing two, France finished the tournament in last place.

France participated in the first 2009 Four Nations tournament against England, New Zealand and Australia. The following year, the tournament was held in Australia and New Zealand, with France's place being taken by a Pacific qualifier.

2010s
With the Four Nations returning to Europe in 2011, France needed to qualify by winning the 2010 European Cup, but failed to do so, with Wales qualifying instead. In 2011 the English team, rather than playing their annual test against France, instead arranged the inaugural 2011 International Origin match.

France participated in the 2013 Rugby League World Cup and hosted some games. They reached the quarter-finals where they were knocked out by England.

In 2014, France played in the 2014 European Cup. They came second in the tournament on points difference, by only 3 points, finishing behind Scotland therefore failing to qualify for the 2016 Four Nations.

In May 2015, France were set to take on South Africa However, the Africans had to withdraw due to the concerns of national contingencies. Therefore, France announced they'd play Serbia in Saint-Esteve on the 22 May. The French, who were labelled as France 'A' due to not being a full-strength side, went on to hammer the Serbs by 68 points to 8.

In October 2015, France played in the 2015 European Cup. During the tournament in November, after already confirming before the tournament's details were announced, France took on England in Leigh. The match was a warm-up game for England before their end-of-year test-series against New Zealand. The French were hammered by a record 80-point margin.

In August 2016 Richard Agar, who began coaching France at the 2013 World Cup, left the national team. It is believed he left because new Fédération Française de Rugby à XIII president Marc Palanques wants a Frenchman to coach the national team. Aurelien Cologni, who had a temporary spell from 2011-2012, became the new coach.

At the 2017 Rugby League World Cup, France were placed in a strong group, pitted against the likes of England, Lebanon and defending champions Australia.  France got off to the worst possible start, suffering a shock loss to Lebanon 29-18 in Canberra.  The following two games did not get any better for the French as they were thumped 52-6 by Australia and then suffered another big defeat to their old foes England 36-6 in Perth. They thus failed to move beyond the group stage and were eliminated from the World Cup.

2020s 

As the winner of the 2018 Rugby League European Championship, France Qualified for the 2021 Rugby League World Cup, their 16th appearance in the competition.  In the lead-up to the tournament, France hosted Tonga for a warm-up match, losing 12–48. The match heralded the introduction of the Tas Baitieri Trophy that both teams will contest each time they meet in future matches.  It is named after former Australian player Tas Baitieri who became coach of the French national team in the 1980s.
France won its opening game in the 2021 Rugby League World Cup 34–12 against Greece.  Unfortunately, they lost their next two games (going down to England 18–42 and then eventual finalists Samoa 4–62).  As a result, France did not finish in the top two of their group and therefore failed to proceed to the quarter finals of the tournament.

Identity

Jersey

Traditionally, France wears a blue jersey usually complemented by a red and white chevron on the chest, white shorts and red socks, with the team being nicknamed Les Tricolores. The uniforms feature the Gallic rooster embroidered on the chest, much like their union counterpart. 
The use of the rooster as badge influenced Eastern Suburbs RLFC, which had uniforms similar to France, to use the rooster as symbol since 1967, being known as Sydney Roosters. Sometimes, France also wears a white jersey in case a colour clash arises.

Kit suppliers and sponsors

Current squad

Squad selected for the 2021 Rugby League World Cup, held in October and November 2022.

Competitive history

Overall

Below are the France international XIII results up until 24 October 2021.

World Cup

Four Nations

European Championship

Honours
Major:
World Cup: 
Runners-up (2): 1954, 1968

Regional:
European Championship: 
Winners (8): 1938-39, 1948–49, 1950–51, 1951–52, 1977, 1981, 2005, 2011, 2018
Runners-up (11): 1935, 1945–46, 1947–48, 1955–56, 1969–70, 1979, 1980, 2003, 2010, 2014, 2015

National coaches

Notable players

Puig Aubert
Jean Dop
Jean Galia
Max Rousié
Jacques Merquey
Gilbert Benausse
Georges Ailleres
Joël Roosebrouck
Jean-Pierre Clar
Fabrice Estebanez

See also

 Rugby league in France
 Elite One Championship
 Lord Derby Cup
 European Nations Cup
 Victory Cup
 Union Treiziste Catalane
 Federation Shield

References

External links
 Federation Francaise de Rugby a Treize national team page (in French)
 France 1951
 France Rugby League Fans Forums - RugbyLeague.org
 2008 Rugby League World Cup Site
French Rugby League Team History at lemondedurugby.chez-alice.fr

 

 
National rugby league teams
Rugby league in France
Rugby League Four Nations